Richelieu was an electoral district of the Legislative Assembly of the Parliament of the Province of Canada, in Canada East, in the Richelieu River valley, north-east of Montreal.  It was created in 1841 and was based on the previous electoral district of the same name for the Legislative Assembly of Lower Canada. It was represented by one member in the Legislative Assembly. 

The electoral district was abolished in 1867, upon the creation of Canada and the province of Quebec.

Boundaries 

The Union Act, 1840 merged the two provinces of Lower Canada and  Upper Canada into the Province of Canada, with a single Parliament.  The separate parliaments of Lower Canada and Upper Canada were abolished.Union Act, 1840, 3 & 4 Vict., c. 35, s. 2. 

The Union Act provided that the pre-existing electoral boundaries of Lower Canada and Upper Canada would continue to be used in the new Parliament, unless altered by the Union Act itself. The Richelieu electoral district of Lower Canada was not altered by the Act, and therefore continued with the same boundaries which had been set by a statute of Lower Canada in 1829:

The electoral district of Richelieu was thus centered on the Richelieu and Yamaska Rivers, south of the Saint Lawrence and north-east of Montreal (now in La Vallée-du-Richelieu Regional County Municipality).

Members of the Legislative Assembly 

Richelieu was represented by one member in the Legislative Assembly. The following were the members of the Legislative Assembly from Richelieu.

Abolition 

The district was abolished on July 1, 1867, when the British North America Act, 1867 came into force, creating Canada and splitting the Province of Canada into Quebec and Ontario.  It was succeeded by electoral districts of the same name in the House of Commons of Canada and the Legislative Assembly of Quebec.

References 

Electoral districts of Canada East